Eddie Henderson (born September 11, 1967 in Seattle, Washington) is a retired U.S. soccer player and current Washington Director of Youth Coaching for the ISC Gunners program. Henderson spent two seasons in the Western Soccer League, one in the American Professional Soccer League, one season in Major Soccer League and seven in the National Professional Soccer League.  He also played for the U.S. at the U-17 and U-20 levels.

High school and college
Henderson, the youngest of 18 children, grew up in Seattle, Washington where he played for the Seattle Kickers, a local youth club.  In 1985 the Kickers won the WSYSA championship.  Henderson attended O'Dea High School where he played both basketball and soccer.  After he graduated from high school, Henderson attended the University of Washington from 1985 to 1989 where he played on the men’s soccer team.  In 1989, he was a third team All-American.  He finished his four years with 29 goals and 21 assists.

Professional
While in college, Henderson spent two seasons as a forward with the Seattle Storm of the Western Soccer League (WSL).  In 1988, he was selected as a first team WSL All Star.  In 1989, he was a second team All Star.  After graduating from the University of Washington, Henderson spent one more season with the Storm, the last in its existence as it folded at the end of the 1990 season.  The Tacoma Stars of the Major Indoor Soccer League drafted Henderson, but he signed with the San Diego Sockers.  The Sockers cut him four games into the 1990-1991 season and he signed with the Milwaukee Wave of the American Indoor Soccer Association in January 1991.  In 1992, Henderson signed with the Wichita Wings of the National Professional Soccer League (NPSL) and remained with the team through the 1997-1998 season.

Junior national teams
Henderson spent time with the U.S. U-17 and U.S. U-23 national team.  He was on the roster for the U.S. at the 1987 U-20 World Cup.

Coaching
After he retired from professional soccer, Henderson spent time as the junior varsity coach at O’Dea High School.  He was also a coach with the Wichita Jets of PDSL for the team’s single season in 2001. Now he coaches ISC Gunners

Henderson also spent time as a stockbroker.  However, he was unable to remain away from soccer and he became the Kansas Director of Youth Coaching before moving to Nevada where he currently holds the same position.

References

External links
 Las Vegas Sun bio
 Husky statistics
 1990 Storm profile
 MISL stats

1967 births
Living people
American soccer players
American soccer coaches
Seattle Storm (soccer) players
Association football midfielders
Association football forwards
Major Indoor Soccer League (1978–1992) players
Milwaukee Wave players
National Professional Soccer League (1984–2001) players
San Diego Sockers (original MISL) players
Washington Huskies men's soccer players
Western Soccer Alliance players
Wichita Wings (NPSL) players
United States men's youth international soccer players
United States men's under-20 international soccer players
United States men's under-23 international soccer players
Soccer players from Seattle